Lycée Français d'Alicante  (LFA) is a French international school in El Campello, Alicante Province, Spain. It serves maternelle/educación infantil (preschool) through lycée/bachillerato.

 the main campus, which is adjacent to Villa Marco, has about 1,300 students. This campus is  large.

The École française Pablo Picasso, an annex of the Lycée Français d'Alicante, is located in Benidorm. It is inside the Finca Barrina - Norte complex. But closed in 2018.

History
The school, which opened in 1962, was established by pied-noir people leaving Algeria. In the aftermath of the Independence of Algeria large numbers of pied-noirs settled in Alicante, leading to the establishment of the new French school.

It was initially inside an apartment building on Calle San Vicente. Until 1965 the school occupied a building in Alicante. Several pied-noirs had moved to Albufereta; 65 of them lived there in 1965. By 2001 French-speakers had a lot of influence in Albufereta and French was commonly spoken there.

In 2005 the school moved into its current location in El Campello.

See also
 Liceo Español Luis Buñuel, a Spanish international school near Paris, France

References

External links
  
 Lycée Français d'Alicante 
 Benidorm School, LFA 

Alicante
Buildings and structures in the Province of Alicante
French international schools in Spain
Schools in Valencia